Octávio Floriano Rodrigues Pato (1 April 1925, Vila Franca de Xira – 19 February 1999) was a Portuguese communist leader.

Biography
Octávio started working at 14 in a shoe factory.  At the same time he also played soccer on S.L. Benfica's youth teams (and remained an unconditional Benfica supporter throughout).  Being a restless person, with an unusual working class feeling, he soon made contact with a group of intellectuals and artists of "neo-realismo" (the Portuguese wave of the socialist realism), such as Soeiro Pereira Gomes and Alves Redol that developed their political work in his home town, Vila Franca de Xira.  After that contact, he adhered to the Communist Youth Federation at the age of 15 and soon began his career as a revolutionary.  Still a teenager, he was an active voice in the organization of the vast wave of strikes that frightened the Portuguese Fascist regime, led by Oliveira Salazar, in 1944.  His brother Carlos was murdered in prison, along with Alfredo Dinis (Alex) and some other top members of the Communist Party at the time.

In 1945 he plunged into clandestinity, controlling and organizing the youth and student branches of the Party.  In 1947 he became responsible for the Lisbon Regional organization and for the party newspaper, Avante!, and the clandestine typographies where the newspaper was printed.  He also joined the Central Committee.

He soon became prosecuted by the anti-communist political police, PIDE, being arrested in 1961. He was beaten and tortured continuously. He endured 11 and then another 7 days standing sleepless (a usual torture method carried by the police), suffered a syncope and near death experience.  Was kept isolated for 4 months.  He didn't speak a word to his captors.

Taken to court, Pato was defended by his long-time friend, the social-democrat Mário Soares (that would become the leader of the Portuguese Socialist Party and President of Portugal).  Pato made a very famous political speech in his defense.  He said he was proud to belong to the PCP and stated his belief in Marxism-Leninism.  He reminded the judges of his imprisoned wife and sons and of his murdered comrades.  He also claimed that his judgment was an attempt on the Universal Declaration of Human Rights.  He qualified the regime as an executive at the service of the monopolists and the latifundia and criticized the country presence in NATO.  At one point, the masters of the show just couldn't stand it anymore.  Police agents started beating him up with clubs right on his accused stand, in front of the judges.  Soares screamed in protest at the bar.  To no avail.  Pato was evacuated from the court and his sentence was read to him in his cell: 8 years in prison that could be adjourned (fascist political sentences were open-ended).

Pato got out of jail in 1970 and plunged again in clandestinity in 1972.  At the time of the Carnation Revolution, he was one of the most important members of the Party, being responsible by almost all the work inside the country, as the Party's General Secretary, Álvaro Cunhal was exiled in Soviet Union.

Later, in 1976, Octávio Pato was the Party's presidential candidate.  For the next years he continued in the Party's Central Committee.

Pato married four times and fathered five children.

Octávio Pato died in 1999, after a long struggle against cancer. He was buried at the cemetery of Alto de São João, in Lisbon, in one of the rare permanent ground graves.

References

1925 births
1999 deaths
People from Vila Franca de Xira
Portuguese Communist Party politicians
Candidates for President of Portugal
Portuguese anti-fascists